The 1930 Perserikatan season (known as the Java Championship) was the inaugural season of the Indonesian Perserikatan football competition since its establishment in 1930.

It was contested by 4 teams as Bond Mataram, Solo Voetbalbond (S.V.B.), Surabaja Indies Voetbalbond (S.I.V.B.) and Voetbalbond Indies Jakarta (V.I.J.). V.I.J. won the championship.

Semifinals

Final

References

External links
P.S.S.I. (inlandsche) Stedenwedstrĳden 1930-1950

1930 in Asian football
1930 in the Dutch East Indies
Seasons in Indonesian football competitions
Sport in the Dutch East Indies
1930 in Dutch sport